WTTA (channel 38) is a television station licensed to St. Petersburg, Florida, United States, serving the Tampa Bay area as an affiliate of MyNetworkTV. It is owned by Nexstar Media Group alongside Tampa-licensed NBC affiliate WFLA-TV (channel 8). WTTA and WFLA-TV share studios on South Parker Street in downtown Tampa; through a channel sharing agreement, the stations transmit using WFLA-TV's spectrum from a transmitter in Riverview, Florida.

Background
The UHF channel 38 allotment in the Tampa–St. Petersburg market had previously been home to the area's first television station, WSUN-TV, which operated from 1953 to 1970. The station, along with WSUN-AM was originally licensed to the City of St. Petersburg. The transmitter was collocated in the WSUN-AM 620 kHz transmitter building on the north side of the Gandy causeway at the west end of the Gandy Bridge. The transmitting antenna was mounted on top of the north tower of WSUN-AM which was modified to hold it without exceeding the original  AGL height. The north tower was and remains adjacent to the transmitter building used as a daytime 620 kHz non-directional radiator while the south tower, on the south side of the Gandy causeway was also used only at night as a directional array. The transmitter building still contains a ladder which descends into a bomb shelter below the bay water as 620 was the original CONELRAD station for the area. The original towers, each located on pilings in Tampa Bay deteriorated with the salt water and sea bird roosting residues and were replaced with new shorter towers on the original pilings in the early 2000s, eliminating the final traces of channel 38 at the 620 kHz transmitting plant.

The station had served as the area's original ABC affiliate until WLCY (channel 10, now CBS affiliate WTSP) signed on in 1965, effectively resulting in WSUN becoming an independent station until it went dark in 1970.

History
In 1979, four applicants filed with the FCC for channel 38. The winner, decided in 1985, was Bay Television, an entity affiliated with the Baltimore-based Sinclair Broadcast Group; the competing applicants included Oak Television of Tampa Bay, a subsidiary of the company behind the ONTV subscription TV service; Home TV, Inc.; and Suncoast 38, a group owned by Clint Murchison. It took years to get the station on the air. In 1987, Sinclair president Bob Simmons was quoted as saying the station would be on the air in late 1988.

WTTA affiliated in September 1990 with the Star Television Network, which offered a mix of older programming and infomercials. That month, there was also an ad for "TV Heaven 38" in the Tampa/Sarasota edition of TV Guide; however, Star would enter financial trouble and the network went dark on January 14, 1991. Before going on air, Bay Television also rebuffed an offer from Telemundo to buy the construction permit.

On June 21, 1991, WTTA signed on the air as an independent station consisting mainly of syndicated programs passed over by the market's other stations, barter programming, network shows not cleared by WFLA-TV (channel 8), WTSP (channel 10) and WTVT (channel 13) and infomercials. Due to its low budget, weekend programming tended to consist entirely of infomercials. WTTA also presented a televised simulcast of the WRBQ-FM (104.7 FM) weekday morning radio show, the Q Morning Zoo, until that station changed formats to country music in 1993. On December 12, 1994, Fox programming moved from WFTS-TV (channel 28) to WTVT as part of a group deal with its then-owners, New World Communications. At the same time, the E. W. Scripps Company (owners of WFTS) cut an affiliation deal with ABC, which resulted in WFTS selling most of its syndicated shows to WTTA. Meanwhile, CBS would move from WTVT to WTSP. Upon the changeover, WTVT chose not to carry the network's children's program block, Fox Kids, which was picked up by WTTA instead. Channel 38 also picked up some syndicated programs that WFTS had no room for on its schedule due to ABC's network-heavy schedule, giving WTTA a stronger programming inventory. Fox Kids later moved to rival WMOR-TV (channel 32), which also carried the successor 4KidsTV block on Sunday mornings until it was discontinued by Fox on December 28, 2008. At one time WTTA was a local broadcast partner of the Tampa Bay Lightning hockey club. They last aired a series of nine Lightning games during the 1999–2000 season.

In September 1999, WTTA became Tampa Bay's affiliate of The WB (replacing charter affiliate WMOR, which reverted to being an independent station), two years after the network entered into a group deal with Sinclair to affiliate the company's independent stations and UPN affiliates with The WB. The station began using the on-air brand "WB 38", and ran cartoons from Kids' WB during the week until January 2006, when the network discontinued its weekday kids block. As a result, Kids' WB programming on WTTA had been relegated to Saturday mornings as of 2006. In 1999, WTTA's operations were taken over by Sinclair after the company entered into a local marketing agreement with Bay Television, which over time had grown become one of the nation's largest television station owners. However, Bay Television was effectively a subsidiary of Sinclair; it was owned by Sinclair CEO David Smith, his brothers J. Duncan, Frederick and Robert Smith, and Robert Simmons. Bay Television could also be considered a shell corporation used for the purpose of circumventing Federal Communications Commission (FCC) ownership rules. Normally, this would apply to a duopoly that Sinclair operates, but the Tampa Bay market is one of the few markets where the company does not own or operate more than one television station.

On January 24, 2006, the Warner Bros. unit of Time Warner and CBS Corporation (which spun off from Viacom at the end of 2005) announced that the two companies would shut down The WB and UPN and combine the networks' respective programming to create a new "fifth" network called The CW. UPN (O&O) station WTOG (channel 44) was named as one of the network's charter affiliates through an 11-station group deal with owner CBS Corporation (with the inclusion for the pass over from Tribune-owned WB affiliates in Philadelphia, Seattle and Atlanta). On February 22, 2006, News Corporation announced the launch of a new "sixth" network called MyNetworkTV, which would be operated by Fox Television Stations and its syndication division Twentieth Television. Sinclair then announced WTTA would be the market's MyNetworkTV affiliate; the station rebranded as "My TV Tampa Bay" the week before that network's September 5, 2006 debut.

On September 3, 2007, channel 38 began airing the controversial Live Prayer with Bill Keller. Keller had been bounced from station to station in the Tampa Bay area and landed on WTTA after a sudden departure from WTOG. The show moved to Ion Television owned-and-operated station WXPX-TV (channel 66) in November 2007, after WTTA imposed new restrictions regarding live programming.

On July 19, 2012, concurrently with Sinclair's announcement that it would purchase six television stations from Newport Television, Sinclair exercised its option to acquire WTTA outright. The FCC approved the sale on August 27, and it was consummated on December 3.

In September 2013, WTTA rebranded as "Great 38", the branding it had used for much of the 1990s. It was the second Sinclair-owned or -operated MyNetworkTV affiliate to drop references to the programming from the station's on-air branding since Cincinnati's WSTR-TV restored its "Star 64" branding in September 2009, and the first entirely not use the network's "blue TV" branding and imaging motif. In conjunction with the rebranding, WTTA began producing several local programs. Our Issues is a community affairs program. Health Matters is a health and lifestyle program based upon paid content. Both programs are hosted by Jenn Holloway. In April 2014, WTTA and the Tampa Bay Rowdies soccer club announced a marketing and broadcast partnership. Under the deal, the station broadcasts twelve Saturday night Rowdies home games, which are preceded by a half-hour pregame show, Rowdies Kickoff. WTTA aired Rowdies home games during the 2014 and 2015 seasons.

On August 20, 2014, Sinclair announced that it would sell WTTA, along with WHTM in Harrisburg (which Sinclair, on behalf of Allbritton is planning on to divest) KXRM-TV and KXTU-LD in Colorado Springs, to Media General in a swap for WJAR in Providence, Rhode Island, WLUK-TV and WCWF in Green Bay, and WTGS in Savannah, Georgia. The swap, part of Media General's merger with LIN Media, will make WTTA a sister station to Media General flagship station WFLA-TV. A condition of the sale maintained the station's affiliation with Sinclair's American Sports Network package of college sports. WHTM's sale of Media General was explored nearly two months earlier, and it was completed, nearly three months before the Media General/LIN deal was completed. The sale was completed on December 19.

Shortly after Media General closed on WTTA, its separate Web site was shut down and replaced with a redirect to a separate section of WFLA-TV's Web site.

On January 27, 2016, it was announced that the Nexstar Broadcasting Group would buy Media General for $4.6 billion. WFLA and WTTA became part of the newly-minted Nexstar Media Group on January 17, 2017.

As a sister to WFLA-TV, WTTA will air NBC programming at times WFLA-TV cannot do so. Such was the case during Hurricane Irma in 2017, when WTTA carried the Sunday Night Football Week 1 contest between the New York Giants and Dallas Cowboys while WFLA-TV had hurricane coverage.

Newscasts

Sinclair era
In August 2003, WTTA established a news department and began airing a late evening newscast at 10 p.m. weeknights in an attempt to compete with WTVT's longer-established primetime newscast. Known as WB 38 News at 10, it was part of Sinclair's controversial centralized News Central operation and featured a mix of local news and sports stories from staff at WTTA's facility, and national and international reports, weather forecasts and sports segments produced out of Sinclair's corporate headquarters on Beaver Dam Road in Hunt Valley, Maryland. It also aired The Point, a controversial one-minute conservative political commentary feature, that was a requirement of all Sinclair-owned stations that aired newscasts (regardless of whether it carried the News Central format or not). Due to poor ratings, WTTA's news department was shut down on March 31, 2006, due to cutbacks in Sinclair's news operations companywide, which included the disbandment of its News Central division, with the newscast being replaced by syndicated programming.

Newscasts returned to the station on October 8, 2007, after Sinclair and future sister station WFLA-TV entered into a news share agreement resulting in a weeknight prime time newscast produced by that station called NewsChannel 8 at 10 on My TV Tampa Bay. Original personnel included news anchors Peter Bernard and Katie Coronado with weather from meteorologists Mace Michaels or Leigh Spann. The broadcast was produced from WFLA's studios on South Parker Street in Downtown Tampa. This arrangement was similar to ones established at Sinclair stations in Raleigh, North Carolina, Buffalo, Flint, Michigan, Charleston, South Carolina, and Las Vegas. The WFLA-produced newscast was cancelled and ended on April 30, 2009.

Media General/Nexstar era

On August 9, 2014, WTTA debuted Great 38 News Now, a series of brief weather and news reports, running thirty seconds in length, three times a day. Initially, the news updates, which debuted eleven days before Media General's acquisition of WTTA, were produced by former sister station WPEC in West Palm Beach. The program since expanded as a half-hour public affairs show on Sunday nights at 7:00 p.m., which was eventually canceled. At the beginning of 2015, production transferred to WFLA-TV, from that station's own studios in Tampa.

On January 4, 2016, WFLA once again began producing a local newscast for WTTA, this time, a nightly hour-long newscast at 8:00 p.m. under the title NewsChannel 8 at 8:00 on Great 38, pushing MyNetworkTV programming back one hour. On August 7, 2017, WFLA began producing another local newscast for WTTA, this time, a two-hour expansion of the former's morning newscast from 7:00 a.m. to 9:00 a.m. under the title NewsChannel 8 Today on Great 38, with the second hour titled Make Today Gr8 with Gayle and Leigh, which is hosted by WFLA morning co-anchor Gayle Guyardo and WFLA morning meteorologist Leigh Spann.

On April 5, 2020, WFLA expanded into Spanish-language news coverage with the addition of a half-hour 9:00 p.m. newscast airing weeknights entitled Noticias Tampa Hoy on WTTA. WFLA also hosts a complementary website which features local news in Spanish.

Technical information

Subchannels
The station's digital signal is multiplexed:

From 2010 to 2012, WTTA and several other Sinclair-owned stations carried TheCoolTV, seen locally on digital subchannel 38.2. On the afternoon of August 31, 2012, TheCoolTV was dropped from the 32 Sinclair stations that carried the network, including WTTA, with no replacement; it would not be until 2015 when WTTA would add another subchannel, Cozi TV.

Analog-to-digital conversion
On February 2, 2009, Sinclair told cable and satellite television providers via e-mail that regardless of the exact mandatory switchover date to digital-only broadcasting for full-power stations (which Congress rescheduled for June 12 days later), the station would shut down its analog signal on the original transition date of February 17. The station's digital signal relocated from its pre-transition UHF channel 57, which was among the high band UHF channels (52–69) that were removed from broadcasting use as a result of the transition, to its analog-era UHF channel 38. In October 2009, the FCC approved a request by WTTA to relocate its digital signal to UHF channel 32 (the former analog frequency of WMOR-TV) to avoid adjacent channel problems from WFTV in Orlando. WTTA moved its digital signal to channel 32 on August 23, 2010 (the channel 38 allocation is now used for the digital signal of WSPF-CD).

References

External links

MyNetworkTV affiliates
Cozi TV affiliates
Television channels and stations established in 1991
1991 establishments in Florida
TTA
Nexstar Media Group